Deh Gerdu (also Romanized as Deh Gerdū and Dehgerdū) is a village in Jowzar Rural District, in the Central District of Mamasani County, Fars Province, Iran. At the 2006 census, its population was 349, in 79 families.

References 

Populated places in Mamasani County